Cambridge Municipal Airport  is a city-owned public-use airport located two miles (3 km) southwest of the central business district of Cambridge, a city in Isanti County, Minnesota, United States.

Although most U.S. airports use the same three-letter location identifier for the FAA and IATA, this airport is assigned CBG by the FAA but has no designation from the IATA (which assigned CBG to Cambridge Airport in Cambridge, England, United Kingdom).

Facilities and aircraft 
For the 12-month period ending May 30, 2006, the airport had 16,850 aircraft operations, an average of 46 per day: 99% general aviation and 1% military. At that time there were 47 aircraft based at this airport: 94% single-engine, 2% multi-engine and 4% helicopter.

References

External links 
 Cambridge Municipal Airport at City of Cambridge web site
  at Minnesota DOT airport directory

 

Airports in Minnesota
Buildings and structures in Isanti County, Minnesota
Transportation in Isanti County, Minnesota
Cambridge, Minnesota